Papito Niang (born 5 December 1988) is a Senegalese professional football player, who most recently played as a forward for FF Jaro in the Ykkönen and represented Senegal in African Cup of Nations. He is the younger brother of Senegalese international Mamadou Niang.

Club career
Papa began his professional football career in Senegalese club ASC Thiès. Papa is well known for his stint with Finnish side FF Jaro, where he played from 2009 to 2012, 2016-2018 and most recently from 2018 to 2020. He scored 37 goals for the club in the Ykkönen.

He has also played for Finnish side FC OPA, AC Oulu, Bolivian side Club Real América, Gabonese side CF Mounana, Kazakh club FC Vostok, Kuwaiti outfit Al-Shabab SC (Al Ahmadi). In 2018, he signed with I-League side Minerva Punjab FC.

International career
He debuted for Senegal against Botswana in 2010. He earned 8 international caps and scored 3 goals for his home nation.

See also
 Senegal national football team
 Mamadou Niang

References

External links
 Papa Niang at playmakerstats.com (English version of ceroacero.es)
 

1988 births
Living people
Senegalese footballers
Senegalese expatriate footballers
Veikkausliiga players
Kazakhstan Premier League players
AC Oulu players
FF Jaro players
FC Vostok players
Expatriate footballers in Finland
Expatriate footballers in Kazakhstan
Expatriate footballers in Kuwait
Expatriate footballers in Gabon
Expatriate footballers in India
Senegalese expatriate sportspeople in Finland
Senegalese expatriate sportspeople in Kazakhstan
Senegalese expatriate sportspeople in Kuwait
Senegalese expatriate sportspeople in Gabon
Association football wingers
Al-Shabab SC (Kuwait) players
Kuwait Premier League players